Defaqto is an independent financial information business, focused on helping financial institutions and consumers make better informed decisions. From its financial product and fund database, Defaqto produces a range of services including: ratings, software, data services, publications and events.

Ratings 
Defaqto produces a range of independent ratings to help consumers understand how financial products fit into the market place.

The ratings are created as expert reviews of financial products (such as Michelin reviews) as opposed to consumer reviews (such as TripAdvisor).

Star Ratings 
Ratings are based on the quality and comprehensiveness of the features and benefits it offers. Defaqto rates individual propositions, not the provider of the product, across more than 60 categories – including banking, general insurance, life and protection, and pensions and investments.

Star Ratings give a product or proposition a rating of 1 to 5, depending on the quality and comprehensiveness of the features it offers. A 4 or 5 Star Rating indicates that a product or proposition represents one of the best quality offerings in the market. The ratings focus on the quality of the product as opposed to its price or the service that you may receive from contact with the provider.

Diamond Ratings 
Ratings help identify where funds and fund families sit in the market, Defaqto Diamond Ratings provide an independent rating based on fund performance, plus various risk attributes where applicable, and a range of other key fund attributes – including cost, scale, access and manager longevity.

Operations 
Defaqto is based in Haddenham, Buckinghamshire.

History 
Defaqto was founded as the Independent Research Group by Alastair Whitehead in 1994, initially focusing on life pensions products.

The business was acquired by Find Portal in 2006 in order to grow the presence in the consumer space.

The management of Defaqto completed a management buy-out supported by Synova Capital in March 2015 for £24m.

SimplyBiz Group plc acquired the entire share capital of Defaqto's holding company, Regulus Topco in March 2019 for £74m.  The company and management continue to operate independently post acquisition.

References 

Financial services companies of the United Kingdom
Privately held companies of the United Kingdom
Financial technology
Companies based in Buckinghamshire
Financial services companies established in 1994
Research and analysis firms of the United Kingdom
1994 establishments in the United Kingdom
Consumer guides
British review websites
British companies established in 1994